Young Adam is a 1954 novel by Alexander Trocchi which tells the story of Joe, a young man who labours on the river barges of Glasgow, and who discovers the body of a young woman floating in the canal. The novel focuses on the relationship between Joe and his companions on the barge – a husband, Les and his younger wife, Ella – and it becomes clearer as the novel progresses that Joe is connected to the dead woman he found. From this comes the saying, "I've shed my own skin and merged into the fog".

This story was adapted into film as Young Adam in 2003 starring Ewan McGregor, Tilda Swinton and Peter Mullan.

References

External links
2002 article in The Telegraph about the novel

Scottish novels
1954 British novels
British novels adapted into films
Novels set in Glasgow
Olympia Press books